, better known by the stage name , is a Japanese voice actress who works for Mausu Promotion. She graduated from Nihon University College of Art.

Notable voice roles

Anime
Hidamari no Ki (2000) (Manjiro's Mother)
Lupin III: Bye-Bye Lady Liberty (xxxx) (Judy)
Saint Tail (xxxx) (Rosemary Sendou)
Kuromajo-san ga Toru!! (2013) (Chikako Kurotori)

Game
Valkyrie Profile (xxxx) (Lorenta, Platina's mother, Old woman at Hai Lan)
Enemy Zero (xxxx) (Kimberly)
Shinobido: Way of the Ninja (xxxx) (Lady Sadame)
Onimusha 3: Demon Siege (xxxx) (Donna Vega)

Tokusatsu
Juken Sentai Gekiranger (2007) (Sea Fist Demon (Confrontation Beast Jelly-Fist) Rageku (eps. 1, 15 - 35, 49))
Kamen Rider W (2009) (Shroud (Fumine Sonozaki) (eps. 19 - 49))
Kamen Rider × Kamen Rider OOO & W Featuring Skull: Movie War Core (2010) (Shroud (Fumine Sonozaki))
Kamen Rider Ghost (2015) (Katchu Gamma  (ep. 21 - 22))

Dubbing

Live-action
Sigourney Weaver
Alien (Ellen Ripley)
Aliens (Ellen Ripley)
Alien 3 (Ellen Ripley)
Alien Resurrection (Ellen Ripley)
Snow White: A Tale of Terror (Lady Claudia Hoffman)
Chappie (Michelle Bradley)
Billie Whitelaw
The Omen (Mrs. Baylock (2nd dub))
Merlin (Auntie Ambrosia)
Quills (Madame LeClerc)
The 33 (María Segovia (Juliette Binoche)
9-1-1 (Athena Grant Nash (Angela Bassett))
Angels in America (Nurse Emily, the Homeless Woman, the Angel of America (Emma Thompson))
Black Panther (Ramonda (Angela Bassett))
Black Panther: Wakanda Forever (Ramonda (Angela Bassett))
Dallas (Sue Ellen Ewing (Linda Gray))
The Dark Crystal (Aughra, SkekEkt)
Dick Tracy (Breathless Mahoney (Madonna))
ER (Dr. Abby Keaton (Glenne Headly))
The Ghost Writer (Ruth Lang (Olivia Williams))
Halloween (Laurie Strode (Jamie Lee Curtis))
Halloween Kills (Laurie Strode (Jamie Lee Curtis))
Halloween II (1988 NTV edition) (Laurie Strode (Jamie Lee Curtis))
The Hand That Rocks the Cradle (Mrs. Mott/Peyton Flanders (Rebecca De Mornay))
Happiest Season (Tipper (Mary Steenburgen))
Harry Potter film series (Sybill Trelawney (Emma Thompson))
The Hole in the Ground (Noreen Brady (Kati Outinen))
Indiana Jones and the Last Crusade (Elsa Schneider (Alison Doody))
The Intern (Fiona (Rene Russo))
Internal Affairs (Kathleen Avilla (Nancy Travis))
Jerry Maguire (Laurel Boyd (Bonnie Hunt))
Labyrinth (Junk Lady)
Leap of Faith (Jane Larson (Debra Winger))
Married to the Mob (Angela de Marco (Michelle Pfeiffer))
Melrose Place (Amanda Woodward (Heather Locklear))
The Missing (Gemma Webster (Keeley Hawes))
Mission: Impossible (1999 Fuji TV edition) (Sarah Davies (Kristin Scott Thomas))
MotherFatherSon (Maggie Barns (Sinéad Cusack))
Passenger 57 (Sabrina Ritchie (Elizabeth Hurley))
Practical Magic (Sally Owens (Sandra Bullock))
Pretty Woman (Vivian Ward (Julia Roberts))
Ready or Not (Becky Le Domas (Andie MacDowell))
The Running Man (1990 TV Asahi edition) (Amber Méndez (María Conchita Alonso))
Spin City (Caitlin Moore (Heather Locklear))
Thumbsucker (Audrey Cobb (Tilda Swinton))
To the Bone (Susan (Carrie Preston))
Twin Dragons (Tong Sum (Nina Li Chi))
X-Men (Mystique (Rebecca Romijn))
X2 (Mystique (Rebecca Romijn))
X-Men: The Last Stand (Mystique (Rebecca Romijn))
Young Sheldon (Victoria MacElroy (Valerie Mahaffey))

Animation
Cybersix (Elaine)
Les Mondes Engloutis (Loria)
X-Men: The Animated Series (Emma Frost)
Looney Tunes (Sylvester's Mother)

References

External links
Naoko Kouda at Mausu Promotion (Japanese)

Naoko Kouda at Foreign Drama Database (Japanese)

1959 births
Living people
Japanese voice actresses
Japanese video game actresses
Nihon University alumni
20th-century Japanese actresses
21st-century Japanese actresses
Male voice actors from Hokkaido
Mausu Promotion voice actors